Flynn Cruiseport Boston, formerly known as the Black Falcon Cruise Terminal, is the main port for all cruise ships visiting Boston, Massachusetts. The port is owned and operated by Massport, which operates most of the Port of Boston, and is located in the Seaport District of Boston. It is primarily open between the months of March and November, with its busiest season being in the early fall, as multiple Canada and New England cruises use Flynn Cruiseport as either a port of call or port of departure. In 2018, the port handled over 389,000 passengers, up over 26% from 2016. Massport handled 402,346 passengers with 138 calls by 34 different ships from 21 cruise lines in 2019.

History

Originally called Black Falcon Cruise Terminal, the port was renamed in 2017 to Flynn Cruiseport Boston after former Boston mayor Raymond Flynn. Flynn opened the cruise terminal in 1986, and in its first year the port hosted 13 ships and 11,723 passengers. The main portion of the terminal underwent an $11 million renovation in 2010, while the secondary terminal was renovated in 2015 for a total of $3.2 million.

Ships

In 2019, six ships were scheduled to utilize Flynn Cruiseport as their port of departure. The ships sail for Norwegian Cruise Line, Holland America Line, Royal Caribbean International, and the Seabourn. These ships include:

Statistics
Massport reports that Flynn Cruiseport supports 1,000 jobs in the Boston area, as well as generates $56 million in business revenue. The port regularly reports its passenger volume numbers for each month it is in operation. Yearly totals can be seen in the table below, with 2019 being updated through July.

References

External links 
Flynn Cruiseport Boston  at Massachusetts Port Authority

Boston Harbor
Massachusetts Port Authority
Infrastructure in Boston
Boston
Transportation in Boston
Maritime history of the United States